Patricia Audrey Anderson  is an Australian human rights advocate and health administrator. An Alyawarre woman from the Northern Territory, she is well known internationally as a social justice advocate, advocating for improved health, educational, and protection outcomes for Indigenous Australian children.

Early years
Anderson grew up in the Parap camp in Darwin, Northern Territory, encountering discrimination and racism. Her mother was part of the Stolen Generation.

Anderson was one of the first Aboriginal graduates from the University of Western Australia.

Career and advocacy
Anderson worked as a legal secretary for the Woodward Royal Commission into Aboriginal Land Rights. In the early 1990s Anderson became the CEO of Danila Dilba Aboriginal Health Service in Darwin. She held the positions of Chair of the National Aboriginal Community Controlled Health Organisation and Executive Officer of the Aboriginal Medical Services Alliance Northern Territory (AMSANT). She led the founding of the Cooperative Research Centre (CRC) for Aboriginal and Tropical Health in 1997, and when the Cooperative Research Centre was refunded in 2003 as The CRC for Aboriginal Health, she took on the role of chair.

Anderson has spoken before the United Nations Working Group on Indigenous Populations. Together with Rex Wild QC, she co-authored the 2007 Little Children Are Sacred report on child abuse in the Northern Territory.

Anderson is the Chairperson of the Lowitja Institute, Australia's National Institute for Aboriginal and Torres Strait Islander Health Research. She was Co-chair on the Referendum Council which consulted with hundreds of Indigenous people to deliver the historic Uluru Statement from the Heart in May 2017.

In May 2020 Anderson would deliver the Lowitja O'Donoghue Oration at the Don Dunstan Foundation.

Works
 Priorities in Aboriginal health (1995) Aboriginal Health: Social and cultural transitions, 29-31.
 
 
 Research for a better future (2011), keynote address to 3rd Aboriginal health research conference.

Awards
 2007 Northern Territory Senior Australian of the Year 
2007 Sidney Sax Public Health Medal - Public Health Association of Australia
 2012 Human Rights Community Individual Award (Tony Fitzgerald Memorial Award)
 2013 Honorary doctorate - Flinders University
 2014 Officer of the Order of Australia (AO) for distinguished service to the Indigenous community as a social justice advocate
 2015 Winner, public policy category, Australian Financial Review and Westpac 100 Women of Influence Awards
 2016 Human Rights Medal - Australian Human Rights Commission
 2017 Doctor of Medical Science honoris causa - Edith Cowan University  
 2018 NAIDOC Lifetime Achievement Award, for decades of advocacy for First Nations people
 2018 Honorary doctorate in Law, University of NSW, in recognition of her lifetime campaign for social justice
 2021 ACT's Senior Australian of the Year, "for her work in advancing the health of Indigenous people"

References

Living people
Public servants of the Northern Territory
Officers of the Order of Australia
Australian indigenous rights activists
Women human rights activists
Year of birth missing (living people)